Senator Tuck may refer to:

Amy Tuck (born 1963), Mississippi State Senate
William M. Tuck (1896–1983), Virginia State Senate